Ana Barati ( born 11 April 1984) is the head coach of Iran's national women's wrestling team. She is a PhD student in the microbiology in Azerbaijan.

Achievements
Head coach of the national team
 Asian Championships – Freestyle wrestling  Kyrgyzstan 2022
 Asian Championships – Alish wrestling  Kyrgyzstan 2022
 Erkinbaev Cup Tournament - wrestling  Kyrgyzstan 2021

Coaching
 World Championships – Alish wrestling  Kyrgyzstan 2016
 World Championships – wrestling  Iran 2015
 Belarus Cup Tournament - wrestling  Belarus 2015

Wrestling career
 Asian Championships – wrestling  Iran 2014
 the Martyrs commanders of Azerbaijan Championships - judo  2011
 Fajr Open of Iran Championships - judo  2014

References

External links
 

1984 births
Living people
Microbiologists
Wrestling coaches